Alan Joseph Gordon Haworth (born September 1, 1960) is a Canadian former professional ice hockey player, who played in the National Hockey League (NHL) between 1980 and 1988. He is the son of Gordie Haworth and the brother of Carey Haworth.

Playing career
Selected in the 1979 NHL Entry Draft by the Buffalo Sabres, Haworth was traded to the Washington Capitals in 1982. After five seasons in Washington, he was dealt to the Quebec Nordiques in 1987 in the trade that brought Dale Hunter to the Capitals.  After one season in Quebec, Haworth opted to play in Switzerland for four seasons, winning two Swiss championships with SC Bern, before retiring from active play. His NHL rights were traded to the Minnesota North Stars for the retired Guy Lafleur after the 1991 NHL Expansion Draft, though neither of them would play in the NHL again.

In 524 NHL games, he scored 189 goals and had 211 assists. As of 2015–16, Haworth is a scout for the Washington Capitals.

Career statistics

Regular season and playoffs

External links
 
 Profile at HockeyDraftCentral.com

1960 births
Living people
Anglophone Quebec people
Buffalo Sabres draft picks
Buffalo Sabres players
Canadian expatriate ice hockey players in Switzerland
Canadian ice hockey centres
Chicoutimi Saguenéens (QMJHL) players
Sportspeople from Drummondville
Quebec Nordiques players
Rochester Americans players
SC Bern coaches
SC Bern players
Sherbrooke Castors players
Washington Capitals players
Washington Capitals scouts